Saint-Maurice-la-Fougereuse is a former commune in the Deux-Sèvres department in western France. On 1 January 2016, it was merged into the new commune Saint-Maurice-Étusson.

Geography
The Layon has its source in the commune.

See also
Communes of the Deux-Sèvres department

References

Former communes of Deux-Sèvres
Populated places disestablished in 2016